The Pecos gambusia (Gambusia nobilis) is a species of fish in the family Poeciliidae endemic to the Pecos River in Texas and New Mexico in the United States.  This two-inch species, as most of its family, is a livebearer.  Females produce broods of up to 40 fry every four to five days.  The fish are omnivorous, eating algae and small invertebrates, and are endangered due to loss of their spring-fed desert habitat.

References

Fish of the United States
Gambusia
Taxa named by Spencer Fullerton Baird
Taxa named by Charles Frédéric Girard
Fish described in 1853
Taxonomy articles created by Polbot
ESA endangered species